Joseph-François Marie (1738 – 1801) was a French mathematician.

He was an abbot and professor of mathematics at the Collège Mazarin.

Works

References 

French abbots
18th-century French mathematicians
1801 deaths
1738 births